Gunnel Broström (1922–2012) was a Swedish stage, film and television actress.  She also directed a number of television films from 1965 onwards. She was married to the journalist Gustaf Olivecrona.

Selected filmography
 Ride Tonight! (1942)
 Adventurer (1942)
 Hans majestäts rival (1943)
 Släkten är bäst (1944)
 Skipper Jansson (1944)
 The Gallows Man (1945)
 Peggy on a Spree (1946)
 The Bells of the Old Town (1946)
 Barbacka (1946)
 Rail Workers (1947)
 Crime in the Sun (1947)
 The Swedish Horseman (1949)
 U-Boat 39 (1952)
 We Three Debutantes (1953)
 Storm Over Tjurö (1954)
 Salka Valka (1954)
 Paradise (1955)
 A Doll's House (1956)
 Wild Strawberries (1957)
 A Goat in the Garden (1958)
 Rider in Blue (1959)
 Stimulantia (1967)
 Rooftree (1967)
 Christopher's House (1979)
 Amorosa (1986)

References

Bibliography
 Steene, Birgitta. Ingmar Bergman: A Reference Guide. Amsterdam University Press, 2005.
 Wright, Rochelle. The Visible Wall: Jews and Other Ethnic Outsiders in Swedish Film. SIU Press, 1998.

External links

1922 births
2012 deaths
Swedish film actresses
Swedish stage actresses
Swedish television actresses
Actresses from Stockholm